C78 or variation, may refer to :

 Ruy Lopez chess openings ECO code
 Secondary malignant neoplasm of respiratory and digestive organs  ICD-10 code
 Medical Examination of Young Persons (Non-Industrial Occupations) Convention, 1946 code
 K&R C (Kerrigan and Ritchie C), C programming language standard released in 1978, sometimes called C78, the original widespread version of C
 Caldwell 78 (NGC 6541), a globular cluster in the constellation Corona Australis
 C-78 Bobcat, a 1954 military aircraft
 , WWII Australian armed merchant cruiser
 , Mexican Navy ship, an Auk-class minesweeper originating in WWII
 Mauser C78 "zig-zag", single-action revolver handgun
 78th edition of Comiket

See also

 
 
 78 (disambiguation)
 c (disambiguation)